Obłuże is a district of Gdynia, Poland, located in the northern part of the city.

Obłuże was once a possession of the Premonstratensian Monastery in Żukowo, administratively located in the Puck County in the Pomeranian Voivodeship of the Kingdom of Poland.

References

Districts of Gdynia